Hiranyamayee Lama was a Bhutanese politician. In 1979 she became the first woman elected to the Tshogdu.

Biography
Lama was K.D. Pradhan's daughter. She was educated in Kalimpong in India and married Dasho Durgadas Lama, who became a royal advisory councillor and was a prominent Christian activist.

In June 1979 Lama was elected to the National Assembly from the Chengmari district as a People's Representative, becoming the first woman to sit in the Parliament of Bhutan.

References

Bhutanese women in politics
Members of the Tshogdu
Bhutanese people of Nepalese descent
20th-century women politicians